The Tasmanian Government Railways B class was a class of  steam locomotives operated by the Tasmanian Government Railways.

History
Between 1894 and 1892, the Tasmanian Government Railways took delivery of 15 B class locomotives from Beyer, Peacock & Co, Manchester. With the arrival of the Q class in 1936, five were retired. The remaining ten were withdrawn in the early 1950s following the arrival of the X class.

References

Beyer, Peacock locomotives
Railway locomotives introduced in 1884
Steam locomotives of Tasmania
3 ft 6 in gauge locomotives of Australia
4-4-0 locomotives